Ingeborg Bachmann – Journey into the Desert is a 2023 European co-production biopic-drama film directed by Margarethe von Trotta and starring Vicky Krieps in titular role. The film depicts the life of Austrian poet and author Ingeborg Bachmann, who lived through 1926 to 1973. 

It is selected to compete for the Golden Bear at the 73rd Berlin International Film Festival, where it had its world premiere on 19 February 2023. It is scheduled for release in French cinemas on October 26, 2023.

Synopsis
The biopic film is about the life of the Austrian poet and author Ingeborg Bachmann, who lived in Berlin, Zurich and Rome. The film depicts her relationship with Max Frisch, and her trip to Egypt. It also showcases her radical texts and readings.

Cast
 Vicky Krieps as Ingeborg Bachmann
 Ronald Zehrfeld as Max Frisch
 Tobias Resch as Adolf Opel
 Basil Eidenbenz as Hans Werner Henze
 Marc Limpach as Tankred Dorst
 Luna Wedler as Marianne Oellers
 Basil Eidenbenz as Hans-Werner Henze
 Roberto Carpentieri as Giuseppe Ungaretti
 Ricardo Angelini
 Thomas Douglas
 Bettina Scheuritzel
 Nina Vorbrodt

Production
The film was shot from 28 March 2022 to 6 June 2022 in Vienna, Rome, Zurich, Luxembourg, and Cologne.

Release
Ingeborg Bachmann – Journey into the Desert will have its  premiere on 19 February 2023 as part of the 73rd Berlin International Film Festival, in competition. It is scheduled to release in cinemas on October 26, 2023.

Reception

On the review aggregator Rotten Tomatoes website, the film has an approval rating of 83% based on 6 reviews, with an average rating of 7/10. On Metacritic, it has a weighted average score of 55 out of 100 based on 5 reviews, indicating "Mixed Or Average Reviews".

Lee Marshall for ScreenDaily wrote in review that "A touching tribute to a woman who, von Trotta suggests, pitted a radical desire to question everything against the comfortable certainties of the men who surrounded her." Marco Vito Oddo graded the film B+ and wrote for Collider, "When so many biopics end in disasters, it is definitely worth praising a refreshing take on the genre, especially when it focuses on a woman who’s equally complicated and fascinating." Ben Rolph graded the film A and wrote for AwardsWatch, "Margarethe von Trotta’s latest film is a graceful triumph of modern European cinema." Davide Abbatescianni, of Cineuropa, heavily criticised the film, labelling it as "a rather outdated upper-class drama," which includes some "unintentionally funny" moments. While acknowledging that the director "steers clear of judging the real-life figures and their troubled existences," the way these are portrayed "makes them look like they belong to the endless series of bourgeois characters that have been filling our screens for decades." Similarly to Abbatescianni, Variety's Jessica Kiang wrote how Vicky Krieps couldn't "save an oldfangled biopic," describing the picture as "a mawkish melodrama more interested in poet and author Bachmann's romantic life than her work."

Accolades

References

External links
  
 Ingeborg Bachmann – Journey into the Desert at Tellfilm 
 
 Ingeborg Bachmann – Journey into the Desert at Berlinale
 Ingeborg Bachmann – Journey into the Desert at Austrian Film Institute
 Ingeborg Bachmann – Journey into the Desert at Film portal 
 

2023 films
Films directed by Margarethe von Trotta
2020s German films
Swiss drama films
2023 drama films
German drama films
2020s German-language films
Austrian drama films
Austrian biographical drama films
2020s biographical films
Cultural depictions of Austrian women
Luxembourgian drama films
Films shot in Vienna
Films shot in Luxembourg